J. M. Gordon House is a historic home located near Odessa, New Castle County, Delaware.  It was built about 1810, and is a -story, three-bay, brick structure with a 2 1/2-half story, four-bay addition.

It was listed on the National Register of Historic Places in 1985.

References

Houses on the National Register of Historic Places in Delaware
Houses completed in 1810
Houses in New Castle County, Delaware
National Register of Historic Places in New Castle County, Delaware